Ambalage is a town in southern Tigray, Ethiopia. Ambalage is located just south of the mountain Amba Alagi, from which the name of the town was derived. An 'amba' is a flat-topped mountain (mesa).

History 
During the Woyane rebellion in 1943, Basha Gugusa, one of the first Woyanne leaders, led the battle of Ambalage in the month of September 1943. In the battle of Ambalage, the rebels gained victory over the Imperial army which was well equipped and supported by British airpower. The Weyane forces outnumbered those of the government, but their advantage in numbers was offset by artillery and British air power.

Geography 
Ambalage is located on the north shore of a stream which runs west towards the Tekeze. Just north of Ambalage, the highway climbs to a height of 3090 meter at the Alagi Pass near the mountain Amba Alagi. Towards the south (Dessie), the road climbs more gently to a height of 2990 meter before going down to Maychew.

Ambalage is in the Southern Zone of the Tigray Region.

Populated places in the Tigray Region